Lluís Sastre Reus (born 26 March 1986) is a Spanish former professional footballer who played as a central midfielder.

Club career
Sastre was born in Binissalem, Mallorca, Balearic Islands. He emerged through FC Barcelona's youth ranks, but only represented its B and C sides.

Acquired by Real Zaragoza in 2007, Sastre moved immediately to another club, Aragonese neighbours SD Huesca, helping it promote to the second division in his first season – a first-ever – and easily retain its status the following campaign. His first game as a professional took place on 31 August 2008, as he featured the full 90 minutes in a 2–2 home draw against CD Castellón.

In summer 2012, Sastre signed a three-year contract with Real Valladolid. He made his La Liga debut on 20 August, coming on as a 78th-minute substitute for Álvaro Rubio in a 1–0 away win over Real Zaragoza; he finished the season with 29 games (13 starts) and one goal, helping his team finish 14th.

After being relegated in 2014, Sastre continued competing in the second tier with Valladolid and CD Leganés. He achieved promotion to the top flight with the latter in 2016, contributing three goals from 33 appearances to this feat.

On 29 December 2016, Sastre cut ties with Leganés and signed a two-and-a-half-year deal with Huesca. The 32-year-old moved abroad in January 2019, joining a host of compatriots at Cypriot First Division's AEK Larnaca FC.

Sastre took his game to the Indian Super League on 8 September 2020, agreeing to a one-year contract at Hyderabad FC. He started in nine of his appearances, adding an assist for the fifth-placed team.

On 28 July 2021, Sastre returned to Spain and joined SD Huesca B. The following 24 February, he announced his retirement at the age of 35.

Personal life
Sastre's older brother, Rafel (ten years his senior), was also a footballer. A defender, he played mainly for Sporting de Gijón, and they coincided at Huesca in 2011–12.

References

External links

1986 births
Living people
Spanish footballers
Footballers from Mallorca
Association football midfielders
La Liga players
Segunda División players
Segunda División B players
Tercera División players
Segunda Federación players
FC Barcelona C players
FC Barcelona Atlètic players
Real Zaragoza players
SD Huesca footballers
Real Valladolid players
CD Leganés players
SD Huesca B players
Cypriot First Division players
AEK Larnaca FC players
Indian Super League players
Hyderabad FC players
Spain youth international footballers
Spanish expatriate footballers
Expatriate footballers in Cyprus
Expatriate footballers in India
Spanish expatriate sportspeople in Cyprus
Spanish expatriate sportspeople in India